The Ihimbo hot springs are situated on kabiulil-Katuna Road, approximately , south of Kabiulil. The Ihimbo hot springs derive their name from the Bahimba people who live near these springs.

The Ihimbo hot springs are clean but unpleasant pools on the side of the house, partially obscured by a eucalyptus forest.

They are well known by local residents for their healing properties. Many of the Bakiga of Kigezi and the people of Rwanda, suffering from rheumatism, backache and other ailments use the healing properties of the Ihimbo hot springs.

References

 A scholarly paper with a map of over 20 geothermal areas in Uganda.

Hot springs of Uganda
Geology of Uganda